Charlotte Florentia Percy, Duchess of Northumberland (née Lady Charlotte Florentia Clive; 12 September 1787 – 27 July 1866), was governess of the future Queen Victoria.

Family 

Born as the younger daughter and third child of the politician Edward Clive, 1st Earl of Powis, and the mineral collector Henrietta Clive, Countess of Powis, she was paternally granddaughter of Major-General Robert Clive, 1st Baron Clive, and maternally granddaughter of Henry Herbert, 1st Earl of Powis. She married Hugh Percy, Earl Percy, son of General Hugh Percy, 2nd Duke of Northumberland, on 29 April 1817. On 10 July the same year, her father-in-law died and her husband succeeded to the dukedom.

Roles 
In 1825, the Duke and Duchess of Northumberland attended the coronation of King Charles X of France as representatives of King George IV of the United Kingdom. Charlotte accompanied her husband to Dublin during his time as Lord Lieutenant of Ireland from 1829 to 1830. In 1831, being a friend of King William IV, she was appointed governess of his niece and heir presumptive, Princess Victoria of Kent, who ascended the British throne in 1837. The role was mostly ceremonial, and Victoria continued to rely mostly on Baroness Louise Lehzen. The Duchess was dismissed in 1837 by the Princess's mother, the Duchess of Kent, for attempting to become more influential in the girl's education and refusing to submit to the Duchess of Kent's comptroller, Sir John Conroy. She had earlier opposed the harshness of the Kensington System, designed by Conroy and the Duchess of Kent, and wrote to Princess Feodora of Leiningen (the Duchess of Kent's daughter and Princess Victoria's elder half-sister) to ask her to tell the King to intervene. Feodora and the Duchess of Northumberland were also determined to protect Baroness Lehzen from the hostility of Conroy and his friend, Lady Flora Hastings.

Death and legacy 

The childless marriage of the Duke and Duchess of Northumberland ended with the Duke's death on 11 February 1847. The Duchess died in Twickenham on 27 July 1866. As a Duchess of Northumberland, she is buried in Westminster Abbey.

The Duchess was born into a plant-loving family and was an avid plant enthusiast herself. She was the first person in Great Britain to cultivate and bring to flower Southern African plants belonging to the genus Clivia, named in her honour by the Kew botanist John Lindley in 1828.

References

Footnotes

Bibliography

External links 

Charlotte Florentia Percy (née Clive), Duchess of Northumberland (1787–1866), Wife of Hugh Percy, 3rd Duke of Northumberland

1787 births
1866 deaths
Charlotte
Daughters of British earls
English governesses
Wives of knights
Queen Victoria
Charlotte
Burials at Westminster Abbey